The Jimmy Fallon Show may refer to:

Late Night with Jimmy Fallon, aired 2009–2014
The Tonight Show Starring Jimmy Fallon, aired 2014–present